The World Cup Fountain was a fountain built to commemorate the 2002 FIFA World Cup co-hosted by South Korea and Japan. The World Cup Fountain is located in the Han River in Seoul, South Korea, between the World Cup Stadium and Seonyudo Park. The fountain is taller than the Gateway Geyser, or the fountain in Fountain Hills, Arizona or the Port Fountain in Karachi, Pakistan. For comparison, the Washington Monument in Washington D.C. is 169 meters tall.

The fountain does not flow constantly. It can only be seen for a few hours a day and weather permitting.

References

Fountain World Cup Fountain
Fountains in South Korea
Buildings and structures in Seoul
Tourist attractions in Seoul